The Kola Province (also known as Kola Block and Kola Domain) is an area of the Fennoscandian Shield spanning an area near the borders of Russia, Finland, and Norway, including the bulk of its namesake Kola Peninsula. The continental crust that makes up the province is a collage of Mesoarchean and Neoarchean age with some lesser amounts being of Paleoproterozoic age.

References

Archean geology
Geography of the Republic of Karelia
Geography of Murmansk Oblast
Geology of European Russia
Geology of Finland
Geology of Norway